Blackjack Ketchum, Desperado is a 1956 American western film directed by Earl Bellamy and starring Howard Duff and Victor Jory. It was based on the novel Kilkenny by Louis L'Amour.

Plot
When a friend in New Mexico is about to be shot, Tom Ketchum draws his gun and kills the brother of Jared Tetlow, a wealthy cattleman. Tom goes to a ranch run by Nita Riordan and her father, where a relationship begins and marriage is discussed.

Tetlow returns, learns from Laurie Webster about the shooting and vows to get vengeance against the man who killed his brother. A cattle war begins as well, but law and order prevails and Tom decides to stay and settle down.

Cast
 Howard Duff as Tom "Blackjack" Ketchum
 Victor Jory as Jared Tetlow
 Margaret Field as Nita Riordan (as Maggie Mahoney)
 Angela Stevens as Laurie Webster
 David Orrick McDearmon as Bob Early (as David Orrick)
 William Tannen as Dee Havalik
 Ken Christy as Sheriff Macy
 Martin Garralaga as Jaime Brigo
 Robert Roark as Ben Tetlow
 Don Harvey as Mac Gill (as Don C. Harvey)
 Pat O'Malley as Doc Blaine
 Jack Littlefield as Burl Tetlow
 Sidney Mason as Matt Riordan

References

External links
 
 
 

1956 films
1956 Western (genre) films
American Western (genre) films
Films based on American novels
Films based on works by Louis L'Amour
Films directed by Earl Bellamy
Columbia Pictures films
1950s English-language films
1950s American films
American black-and-white films